Khairullin, Khayrulin or Khairulin ( or Хайрулин) is a Tatar masculine surname, its feminine counterpart is Khairullina, Khayrulina or Khairulina. It may refer to
Galimdzhan Khayrulin (born 1974), Russian football manager and a former player
Ildar Khairullin (born 1990), Russian chess player
Marat Khairullin (born 1984), Kazakh football player
Ramil Khayrulin (born 1985), Russian film producer, filmmaker and screenwriter